The Embassy of Turkey in Seoul is the diplomatic mission of Turkey in South Korea.

History 
The current ambassador Ersin met with North Korean president Kim Yong-nam in 2018. In the meeting, Kim requested that a North Korean embassy be established in Turkey. Ersin declined the invitation, saying that it was currently not possible due to US sanctions.

References 

Turkey
Seoul
South Korea–Turkey relations